This article gives an overview of the heath communities in the British National Vegetation Classification system.

Introduction

The heath communities of the NVC were described, along with the mire communities, in Volume 2 of British Plant Communities, first published in 1991.

In total, 22 heath communities have been identified.

The heath communities consist of six separate subgroups:
 five lowland dry heath communities, all with distinct, largely non-overlapping distributions in England and Wales (H1, H2, H6, H8 and H9)
 three localised communities, with non-overlapping ranges in southern England, which are considered transitional between the above and the wetter communities classified in the NVC as mires (H3, H4 and H5)
 two maritime heath communities, found exclusively on the coasts of northern and western Britain; one (H7) is more widespread than the other (H11)
 four submontane heaths from upland areas in northern and western Britain; two of these (H10 and H12) are widespread, whereas the other two (H16 and H21) are more localised (confined to Scotland, and Scotland and the Lake District, respectively)
 two sub-alpine communities, considered transitional between the previous and next groupings - H18, which is widespread in northern and western Britain), and H22, which is confined to Scotland
 six montane heath communities with lichens and mosses, all of which are confined either to Scotland (H13, H14, H15, H17 and H20) or to Scotland and the Lake District (H19)

List of heath communities

The following is a list of the communities that make up this category:

 H1 Calluna vulgaris - Festuca ovina heath
 H2 Calluna vulgaris - Ulex minor heath
 H3 Ulex minor - Agrostis curtisii heath
 H4 Ulex gallii - Agrostis curtisii heath
 H5 Erica vagans - Schoenus nigricans heath
 H6 Erica vagans - Ulex europaeus heath
 H7 Calluna vulgaris - Scilla verna heath
 H8 Calluna vulgaris - Ulex gallii heath
 H9 Calluna vulgaris - Deschampsia flexuosa heath
 H10 Calluna vulgaris - Erica cinerea heath
 H11 Calluna vulgaris - Carex arenaris heath
 H12 Calluna vulgaris - Vaccinium myrtillus heath
 H13 Calluna vulgaris - Cladonia arbuscula heath
 H14 Calluna vulgaris - Racomitrium lanuginosum heath
 H15 Calluna vulgaris - Juniperus communis ssp. nana heath
 H16 Calluna vulgaris - Arctostaphylos uva-ursi heath
 H17 Calluna vulgaris - Arctostaphylos alpinus heath
 H18 Vaccinium myrtillus - Deschampsia flexuosa heath
 H19 Vaccinium myrtillus - Cladonia arbuscula heath
 H20 Vaccinium myrtillus - Racomitrium lanuginosum heath
 H21 Calluna vulgaris - Vaccinium myrtillus - Sphagnum capillifolium heath
 H22 Vaccinium myrtillus - Rubus chamaemorus heath

Sources

 Rodwell, J. S. (1988) British Plant Communities Volume 2 - Mires and heaths  pages vii, 347 - 358

 
Heaths of the United Kingdom